Frank Edward Bemrose (20 October 1935 – 2001) was an English footballer who played as a winger.

References

1935 births
2001 deaths
English footballers
Association football wingers
Caistor F.C. players
Grimsby Town F.C. players
Gainsborough Trinity F.C. players
Louth United F.C. players
English Football League players